The Hyuga fanray (Platyrhina hyugaensis) is a type of ray of the family Platyrhinidae. The population of this ray are decreasing due to continuous human exploitation.

Description 
The Hyuga fanray can be differentiated from its congeners because of numerous characteristics, including a pair of thorns on anterior part of scapular section, a row of thorns on mid-dorsum of tail, and dermal denticles of uniform size and shape covering the dorsal surface.

Habitat and distribution 
Its endemic and common habitat is Hyūga Sea in southern Miyazaki Prefecture, although there have also been several discoveries in Kagoshima and Mie Prefectures. 

The Hyuga fanray experiences a decline in population because it is often taken as bycatch with gillnets or trawls, and probably is used for human consumption. It is predicted that the ray has undergone a population depletion of up to 49% over the past 21 years.

References 

Fish of Japan
Fish of the North Pacific
Myliobatiformes